Kevin Scott Fagan (born April 25, 1963) is a former American football defensive end who played seven seasons (1986–1993) for the San Francisco 49ers of the National Football League. Fagan was regarded as one of the best run stopping defensive linemen in professional football, until several injuries including back, shoulder, and knee issues forced him to retire following the 1993 season. In 1990, Fagan earned second-team UPI all-pro honors. 

Although he was drafted in 1986, he didn't make his official debut until 1987 for San Francisco.

Fagan was one of the NFL's strongest men, having recorded a Miami school record 560 pound bench press. 

Fagan graduated in 1981 from John I. Leonard High School in Lake Worth, where he played football and track and field. He played college football at the University of Miami and is a member of the UM Sports Hall of Fame.

Fagan has previously served as a football coach for Dunnellon High School in Dunnellon, Florida, and also coached softball there.

From 2014 through 2020, Fagan was the head softball coach of the College of Central Florida.

On August 28, 2020, Fagan was named the new head softball coach at Emmanuel College in Georgia.

Personal life

Fagan's daughters Kasey, Sami, and Haley played collegiate Division I softball, and both Sami and Haley went on to play professionally. He also has another daughter, Cameron, and two sons, Cole and Jack.

References

External links
 American Football Spectacular: Great 49er Mustaches: Kevin Fagan

1963 births
Living people
American football defensive ends
Miami Hurricanes football players
People from Lake Worth Beach, Florida
Players of American football from Florida
San Francisco 49ers players
Sportspeople from the Miami metropolitan area
People from Dunnellon, Florida